The Decentralized Administration of Crete is one of the seven decentralized administrations of Greece, solely consisting of the region of Crete. Its seat is in Heraklion.

Formation and tasks

Decentralized Administrations were created in January 2011 as part of a far-reaching reform of the country's administrative structure, the Kallikratis reform (Law 3852/2010).

They enjoy both administrative and financial autonomy and exercise devolved state powers in urban planning, environmental and energy policy, forestry, migration and citizenship. Beyond that, they are tasked with supervising the first and second-level self-governing bodies: the municipalities and regions, in this case the 24 municipalities of Crete and the region itself.

Characteristics
With an overall population of  it is also the third smallest decentralized administration by population, though having recently surpassed the much larger Decentralized Administration of Epirus and Western Macedonia.

In the European NUTS nomenclature, Crete together with the two regions of the Decentralized Administration of the Aegean forms the first level NUTS region EL4 (Nisia Aigaiou, Kriti).

Secretary-General
The Decentralized Administration is led by a Secretary-General who is appointed or dismissed by a Cabinet decision upon request of the Greek Minister of Interior, and is therefore considered the senior representative of the national government in the regions.

Following the electoral victory of Syriza in January 2015, the new Minister for the Interior, Nikos Voutsis, declared that the decentralized administrations would be abolished, and their powers transferred to the regions. Until this reform is formalized, and as the Secretaries-General appointed by the previous administration resigned on 2 February, the decentralized administrations are run by their senior civil servants as Acting Secretaries-General.

References

Literature

External links
  

2011 establishments in Greece
Crete
Crete